Crossed Swords  or The Teacher of Don Juan (Italian: Il Maestro di Don Giovanni) is a 1954 historical swashbuckling adventure film directed by Milton Krims and starring Errol Flynn, Gina Lollobrigida and Nadia Gray. It was co-production between Italy and the United States. It was shot at the Cinecittà Studios in Rome. The film's sets were designed by the art director Arrigo Equini.

Plot
The film is set in Early Modern Italy in the Duchy of Sidona. Raniero and Renzo are two friends who have been travelling together for two years, having adventures, fighting duels and womanizing. Raniero is the son of the Duke of Sidona, and the elder Renzo his Don Juan-type mentor.

On their way back to Sidona after a two-year absence, Renzo and Raniero encounter Fulvia, a former lover of Renzo. She attacks him then invites him to her estate.

Fulvia's rich husband Gennarelli is at a meeting at Sidona. Pavoncello, the Duke's counselor, is suggesting a new law where all men under twenty must marry and produce children or face imprisonment. (The aim is to ensure future manpower to defend the duchy). The Duke is unsure whether the law is what the people want and refuses to sign it until he consults them.

Gennarelli returns to his estate and surprises Renzo and his wife. The two men fight a duel which Renzo easily wins. Renzo and Raniero head to the castle where the Duke welcomes them. The Duke's daughter, Francesca, regards Renzo as a bad influence on her brother but is attracted to him.

Fulvia arranges a joust with Indian sticks between Renzo and Pavoncello, who wants to marry Francesca. Both men are wounded and the duke stops the contest.

Gennarelli approaches Pavoncello, suggesting he use the proposed law to drive Renzo out of Sidona. Gennarelli and Pavoncello join forces to persuade the Duke to sign the law.

Renzo flees Sidona with Raniero. Pavoncello hires an assassin, Lenzi, to kill Renzo and Raniero.  It is revealed Pavoncello wants to take over Sidona and surrounding areas as well; he arranges Lenzi to hire two hundred mercenaries.

Renzo and Raniero are eating in a tavern when attacked by Lenzi's men but they defeat them. They return to the castle and overhear Fulvia talking to Gennarelli about the latter's plan with Pavoncello.

Renzo and Raniero are captured. Lenzi's mercenary army enters Sidona, and imprisons the Duke and Francesca.

Fulvia helps Renzo and Raniero to escape. They manage to rescue the Duke and Francesca and lead an uprising. Francesca uses the women of Sidona to seduce Lenzi's mercenaries. This enables Renzo to kill Lenzi, and for Raniero to raise the Duke's loyal supporters in rebellion. Renzo kills Pavoncello in a sword duel.

Renzo agrees to marry Francesca.

Cast
Errol Flynn as Renzo
Gina Lollobrigida as Francesca
Cesare Danova as Raniero
Nadia Gray as Fulvia
Roldano Lupi as Pavoncello
Alberto Rabagliati as Gennarelli
Paola Mori as Tomasina
Silvio Bagolini as Buio
Renato Chiantoni as Spiga
Riccardo Rioli as Lenzi
Pietro Tordi as The Duke

Production

Background
Milton Krims announced he was to write and produce a film called The Ninth Man in 1950 based on a 1920 novel by Mary Heaton Vorse set in Italy in the fifteenth century.

In 1952 it was announced Krims would make The Ninth Man with Errol Flynn in the lead for Constellation Films with J. Barrett Mahon to act on Flynn's behalf behind the scenes.

In January 1953 it was announced Flynn would star in Teacher of Don Juan, a co production between Errol Flynn Enterprises and Vittorio Vasserotti.

Flynn produced the film in association with Barry Mahon in an attempt to emulate the success of The Adventures of Don Juan (1948), which had sold well in Europe on its release by Warner Bros. John Bash helped Flynn finance the film.

Shoot
Filming took place in Italy in February 1953. It was shot at Cinecittà Studios in Rome with exteriors shot in the village of Lauro.|author=It was the first role for Gina Lollobrigida beyond the Italian market, and her fee was 30 million lira (est. $48,000). She made it immediately before Beat the Devil.

The movie was shot in Pathecolor, a new color process developed by Pathe Industries.

It was known during filming as The Master of Don Juan or Teacher of Don Juan.

Reception

Critical
The Chicago Daily Tribune said the film "offers very little interest" apart from the photography.

Filmink magazine wrote "The most frustrating thing about the movie is that it's full of good ideas... but they don’t develop any of them."

Box office
Box office reception was disappointing – Flynn later claimed the film was sold "very badly". Dorothy Kilgallen later wrote that Flynn's share from the film "amounts to quite a pile of bills" but he never received the money because "they're all Washington-bound to defray his staggering tax debt."

Legacy
The experience prompted Flynn to try another production in Italy, the disastrous William Tell. Shortly after the shoot Flynn's wife gave birth to a baby girl.

References

External links

Review of film at Variety

American historical adventure films
American swashbuckler films
Italian swashbuckler films
1950s historical adventure films
Italian historical adventure films
English-language Italian films
Films set in the 16th century
Films set in Italy
Films shot at Cinecittà Studios
Titanus films
United Artists films
1950s English-language films
1950s Italian films